The Peruvian-Bolivian War was a warlike confrontation between Peru and Bolivia in the years 1841 and 1842.

In 1841, Agustín Gamarra, President of Peru, tried to annex Bolivia (the former colonial Charcas Audience), which cost the Peruvian president his life on November 18, 1841 at the Battle of Ingavi. The Bolivian Army, under the command of General José Ballivián, occupied the Peruvian provinces of Moquegua, Puno, Tarapacá, Tacna and Arica.

The eviction of Bolivian troops in southern Peru would be achieved by the increased availability of material and human resources in Peru. At the end of the war, the Treaty of Puno was signed on June 7, 1842.

Occupation of La Paz
Peruvian troops led by President Gamarra began the march to Bolivia on October 1, 1841, crossing the border the next day. After advancing without encountering resistance, on October 15 they entered La Paz without fighting. Ballivián's manifesto to oppose the invaders, however, was soon applied by the population.

On October 21, in the town of Mecapaca, a battle occurred between the Peruvian and Bolivian forces, as that town was occupied by a Peruvian column under the command of Colonel San Román, who was later attacked by the Bolivian 5th Battalion and a detachment of cuirassiers. The Peruvians, taken by surprise, rallied and forced their enemies to retreat in disorder. Soon, however, a crowd from La Paz stormed the city's hospital where the wounded soldiers and officers had been taken in order to kill them.

Battle of Ingavi

The battle of Ingavi took place on November 18, 1841 in the town of Viacha within Ingavi Province. There, Bolivian troops under the command of José Ballivián clashed with Peruvian troops under Agustín Gamarra, defeating the Peruvian troops and killing General Gamarra in the process.

The defeat of the Peruvian Army gave Ballivián and the Bolivian Army the opportunity to counterattack and invade Peruvian territory, approaching Cuzco and threatening to seek the annexation of the port of Arica, which at the time was claimed by Bolivia since its Bolivarian era in order to be able to improve its economy significantly.
Bolivian troops occupied the provinces of Tacna, Arica and Tarapacá within Moquegua Department.

Occupation of Southern Peru
At the end of 1841, after the battle of Ingavi, troops of the Bolivian Second Division under General José Ballivián occupied Peru from Moquegua to Tarapacá. Then various fronts of struggle were opened in southern Peru.

On December 9, 1841, a regiment under the command of Colonel Rodríguez Magariños occupies Tacna, another under the command of Colonel Bernardo Rojas occupies Arica, and another under the command of Colonel José María García occupies Tarapacá, while José Ballivián's forces occupy Moquegua and Puno.

Peruvian resistance and counterattack
Colonel Manuel de Mendiburu, who was the military commander of the South, returned from Lima to organize the Peruvian resistance to the Bolivian occupation.

With this, Juan Bautista Ramos, a major in the Peruvian Army from Arica, organized a guerrilla war with local volunteers where they faced and defeated the Bolivian forces of Bernardo Rojas in Arica on December 25, 1841. In Sama, Colonel José María Lavayén organized a troop that managed to defeat the Bolivian forces of Colonel Rodríguez Magariños. In Locumba, Colonel Manuel de Mendiburu also organized forces, including Justo Arias y Aragüez in 1842.

José Rosa Ara also organized a column in Tacna between Peruvian soldiers and peasants and in the battle of Altos de Chipe they defeated a Bolivian regiment.

The Bolivian Army did not have enough troops to maintain the occupation. In the battle of Tarapacá, Peruvian montoneros formed by Major Juan Buendía, coming from Iquique, defeated on January 7, 1842, the detachment led by Colonel José María García, who was killed in the confrontation. Thus, the Bolivian troops vacated Tacna, Arica and Tarapacá in February 1842, retreating towards Moquegua and Puno.

The fighting in Motoni and Orurillo dislodged and subsequently began the withdrawal of Bolivian forces that occupied Peruvian territory, again threatening Bolivia with another invasion.

Treaty of Puno

The two nations signed the Treaty of Puno on June 7, 1842, officially ending the war. Both countries agreed to remain as separate sovereign states and the retreat of troops in Peruvian territory was accomplished eight days later. Bolivia unconditionally renounced all claims in southern Peruvian territory, but nevertheless, the treaty did not manage to solve the border problem between the two states.

The conflict ended with a return to the situation before the war. Despite this, Peruvian historiography argues that the victories seen in all the battles in Peruvian soil overshadow the defeat at Ingavi, leaving Peru in a more favorable outcome after the end of the war.

Although in the document Bolivia and Peru agreed not to touch on the issue of unification as a single state, in 1880 Presidents Nicolás de Piérola and Narciso Campero began a project for the national union of the two countries known as the United States of Peru–Bolivia, which ended up never happening. With the re-emergence of nationalism and anti-Chilean sentiment as a consequence of the War of the Pacific, the prospect of unification again began to become more common in political discourse between both states.

See also
 Peru–Bolivian Confederation

References

Battles involving Peru
Battles involving Bolivia
1841 in Bolivia
1841 in military history